The 1951 SANFL Grand Final was an Australian rules football championship match.   beat  72 to 61.

References 

SANFL Grand Finals
SANFL Grand Final, 1951